Tsok Pok Hang Village, also referred to as Tsok Pok Hang San Tsuen or Tsok Pok Hang Resite Area, is a village in Sha Tin District, Hong Kong.

Administration
Tsok Pok Hang Resite Area is a recognized village under the New Territories Small House Policy. For electoral purposes, Tsok Pok Hang San Tsuen is part of the Jat Chuen constituency.

History
Tsok Pok Hang was previously named Sok Pok Hang.

See also
 Kau Yeuk (Sha Tin)
 Lion Rock Country Park
 Scout Association of Hong Kong

References

External links

 Delineation of area of existing village Tsok Pok Hang (Sha Tin) for election of resident representative (2019 to 2022)

Villages in Sha Tin District, Hong Kong